Nitin Saxena (born 3 May 1981) is an Indian scientist in mathematics and theoretical computer science. His research focuses on computational complexity.

He attracted international attention for proposing the AKS Primality Test in 2002 in a joint work with Manindra Agrawal and Neeraj Kayal, for which the trio won the 2006 Fulkerson Prize, and the 2006 Gödel Prize. They provided the first unconditional deterministic algorithm to test an n-digit number for primality in a time that has been proven to be polynomial in n. This research work came out as a part of his undergraduate study.

Early life and education 
He is an alumnus of Boys' High School And College, Allahabad. He graduated with his B.Tech in Computer Science and Engineering from Indian Institute of Technology Kanpur in 2002. He received his PhD from the Department of Computer Science and Engineering of the same institute in 2006 with the Dissertation titled "Morphisms of Rings and Applications to Complexity".

Career 
He was awarded the Distinguished Alumnus Award of the Indian Institute of Technology Kanpur in 2003 for his work in computational complexity theory. He was  appointed at the Centrum Wiskunde & Informatica (CWI) starting as a postdoc researcher from September 2006 onwards. He was a Bonn Junior Fellow at the University of Bonn from Summer 2008 onwards.  He joined the Department of Computer Science and Engineering at IIT Kanpur as faculty in April 2013.

Saxena was awarded the 2018 Shanti Swarup Bhatnagar Prize for his work in Algebraic Complexity Theory. One of the youngest awardees, Saxena’s research interests include Computational Complexity and Algebraic Geometry.

References

External links
Nitin Saxena's Homepage
Profile of Nitin Saxena at the IIT Kanpur Alumni Association
.

1981 births
Living people
Indian computer scientists
Gödel Prize laureates
IIT Kanpur alumni
Academic staff of the University of Bonn
Recipients of the Shanti Swarup Bhatnagar Award in Mathematical Science
Theoretical computer scientists